Conan are a British doom metal band from Liverpool, England whose style is characterised by a heavily distorted and downtuned sound. It has been described as "caveman battle doom".

History 
Conan was founded as a two piece by guitarist/singer Jon Davis in 2006, with Richie Grundy on drums. Following the departure of Grundy, Paul O'Neil took over on drums before the band went on nearly a year-long hiatus.  Once activity resumed, the band added the position of bass guitarist and went through several musicians before Chris Fielding joined in 2013.  Longtime drummer O'Neil, who had performed on both of the band's full-length albums, was replaced by Rich Lewis in 2014. On 31 March 2015, the band announced that they would be headlining a US tour with support Samothrace and Mantar. The tour consisted of 11 dates, including Psycho California and Maryland Deathfest.

In June 2015, the band announced they had begun the writing process for a new album. On 15 October, the band announced their third full-length album would be titled Revengeance, as well as a release date of 29 January 2016. On 3 August 2017 the band announced on their Facebook page the departure of Lewis.

The fourth Conan studio album entitled Existential Void Guardian was released on 14 September 2018. The band's fifth album, Evidence of Immortality, was released on 19 August 2022.

Members 

Current Members
 Jon Davis - vocals, guitar (2006-2008, 2009–present)
 Chris Fielding - bass (2013–present)
 Johnny King - drums (2017–present)

Former Members
 Richie Grundy - drums (2006)
 Paul O'Neil - drums (2007–2008, 2009–2014)
 John McNulty - bass (2009–2010)
 Dave Perry - bass, vocals, synth (2011)
 Phil Coumbe - bass, vocals (2011–2013)
 Rich Lewis - drums (2014–2017)

Timeline

Discography

Albums 
 Monnos CD/LP (2012, Burning World Records)
 Blood Eagle CD/LP (2014, Napalm Records)
 Revengeance CD/LP (2016, Napalm Records)
 Existential Void Guardian (2018, Napalm Records)
 Evidence of Immortality (2022, Napalm Records)

EPs 
 Battle in the Swamp (2007 demo)
 Horseback Battle Hammer (2010 Throne Records)

Split EPs 
 Conan vs. Slomatics (2011 Head of Crom Records)
 Conan / Bongripper (2013 Holy Roar Records)

Live albums 
 Mount Wrath: Live at Roadburn 2012 (2013 Roadburn Records)
 Live at Bannermans (2015 Black Bow Records)
 Live at Freak Valley (2021)

References 

English doom metal musical groups
Musical groups from Liverpool
Musical groups established in 2006